Sorry, You Can't Get Through! is a 2005 Italian comedy film written and directed by Paolo Genovese and Luca Miniero.

Plot
Walter is a lonely pensioner still full of energy and imagination; convinced by a newspaper article that for every young man who works there is an elderly person who stays at home, Walter decides to go and find this young man, and to help him by hanging around. Helped by little Sara, his only friend and ally, and mocked by a cynical doorkeeper, Walter picks Piero, a tireless but shy worker.

Walter enters Piero's life in an overbearing way, without asking permission; he turns the young man's life upside down but teaches him a new perspective from which to look at himself and the world, as well as techniques to conquer Francesca, Sara's single mother who is disappointed by men, and with whom Piero has fallen in love. Piero first tries to completely change his lifestyle, playing the role of a strong and exuberant man, capable of conquering the woman he loves with a snap of his fingers, but later realizes that this facade causes him suffering rather than joy, even though he has won Francesca's heart. Piero then confesses this to her through a romantic letter.

Cast
 Carlo Delle Piane as Walter
 Pierfrancesco Favino as  Piero (shy)
 Valerio Mastandrea as  Piero (extrovert)
 Nicole Murgia as  Sara
 Lorenza Indovina as  Francesca
 Anna Falchi as  Sonia
 Gianfranco Funari as Himself

See also
 List of Italian films of 2005

References

External links
 

2005 films
2005 comedy films
Films directed by Paolo Genovese
Films directed by Luca Miniero
Italian comedy films
2000s Italian-language films